Cramer-Krasselt is an American integrated marketing and communications agency. It is the second-largest independent advertising agency in the United States according to Advertising Age in terms of revenue and is probably best known for its ads for Corona Beer, Porsche, Tropicana and Careerbuilder.com.

Formation and overview
The agency was founded in 1898 in Milwaukee by Fred "Cody" Cramer and William Krasselt. They relocated their headquarters to Chicago in the mid-1980s, where it remains as of 2022. Other offices include New York and Milwaukee.

Clients include Cat's Pride, Corona Extra, Cintas, Pacifico Beer, Porsche, Tropicana, and others. In 2011, they took on the $50M account for Cedar Fair, the company that owns Knott's Berry Farm.

In 2018, the agency was named the second most effective independent agency in North America by the Effie organization.

References

External links
 

Advertising agencies of the United States
Companies based in Chicago
Business services companies established in 1898